Sally (or Sara or Sarah) Jane Cairns (December 7, 1919 – February 9, 1965) was an American film actress. She appeared in over 15 films between 1940 and 1944.

Early years 
The daughter of Mr. and Mrs. William P. Cairns, she studied at California High School (Pennsylvania) in California, Pennsylvania. As a youngster, she performed with the Stone House Players community theater group. In 1939 she had her first lead with the group.

Career
Cairns sang with the Ted Waldron Orchestra. During her junior year at Duquesne University, she won the local Gateway to Hollywood acting competition, beating out over 500 applicants. She finished second in the national competition, losing to Gale Storm.

Upon arriving in Hollywood in 1940, Cairns made her film debut with cowboy star Addison Randall in Covered Wagon Trails. Modern television viewers will recognize Cairns for her roles in two Three Stooges films from the 1940s. She was Moe Howard's dancing partner who manages to lose her skirt in Three Smart Saps. Cairns also appeared as Tizzy in the film Back from the Front. Thanks to the popularity of the Stooges, Cairns is seen almost daily worldwide due to the films' constant television broadcasts.

Her last studio affiliation was with RKO Pictures.

Death
Cairns died of colorectal cancer on February 9, 1965, at age 45. She is buried at Holy Cross Catholic Cemetery in Pomona, California.

Personal
Cairns was married twice, first to Thomas Piper on May 26, 1940. Her second marriage was to Harold Lewis, a second unit director and production manager. They had a daughter, Deanne, born in 1946.

References

External links

1919 births
1965 deaths
Deaths from cancer in California
Deaths from colorectal cancer
American film actresses
Actresses from Pennsylvania
Duquesne University alumni
20th-century American actresses
Burials in California